4′-Fluorococaine is a tropane derivative drug which is a synthetic analogue of cocaine. Unlike related compounds such as the corresponding 4′-fluorophenyltropane derivative CFT and the 2′-hydroxy analogue salicylmethylecgonine, 4′-fluorococaine has only around the same potency as cocaine as an inhibitor of dopamine reuptake, but conversely it is a much stronger serotonin reuptake inhibitor than cocaine, resulting in a significantly altered pharmacological profile in animal studies.

See also 
 pFBT
 Cocaethylene
 List of cocaine analogues

References 

Tropanes
Serotonin–norepinephrine–dopamine reuptake inhibitors
Stimulants
Local anesthetics
Cocaine
Fluoroarenes